Arnäs may refer to:
Arnäs Court District
Ärnäs, Sweden (disambiguation)
Årnäs, Sweden (disambiguation)
 Arnis (Danish: Arnæs), Schleswig-Holstein, Germany